Pierdavide Carone (born 30 June 1988 in Rome, Italy) is an Italian singer-songwriter.

Career

Amici and the first album Una Canzone Pop 
He was a contestant of the ninth edition of the Italian popular talent show Amici di Maria De Filippi; he reached the finals and finished in third place. He also won the critics award. He signed a contract with Sony Music Entertainment and during the final of the show he won the prize of journalistic criticism of the value of 50,000 euros.  His debut album Una Canzone Pop peaking the No. 1 in the Italian album chart and has been certified double platinum in Italy. Even his first single "Di Notte" reached No. 1 in Italy. He is also the author of the song "Per tutte le volte che...", performed by Valerio Scanu, who won the Sanremo Festival 2010. He also released the book I sogni fanno rima which was an editorial success. On July, he released the second single from the album: Mi piaci...ma non troppo.

Second album: Distrattamente 
On 29 October 2010 the single La prima volta was released. It was the lead single from his second album Distrattamente, released the following 23 November. The album reached #13 in the Italian charts. He wrote the song "Guardando Verso il Mare" for Matteo Macchioni (released in Macchioni's first album in 2011). Pierdavide is currently touring Italy with his "Distrattamente Tour".
On July and August, Carone had opened several concerts of Franco Battiato.
His single, "Volo a Rio" was released on 16 September 2011. The song was taken from the concept album dedicated to Rio, a 2011 animated film by 20th Century Fox and Blue Sky Studios.

Sanremo Music Festival 2012 and the third album 
Carone participated in the sixty-second edition of the Sanremo Music Festival alongside Lucio Dalla. They performed the song Nanì, which they wrote together. Shortly afterward, Carone released a new album named Nanì e altri racconti. Twelve days after the Sanremo festival, Lucio Dalla died.
That same year, 2012, Carone took part in the eleventh edition of Amici, in the "Big" category.
On 6 April 2012 Sony Music Italy announced the second single from "Nanì e altri racconti": 'Basta Così'.

Discography

Albums

Singles

Awards and nominations

References

External links
 Official website

Italian singer-songwriters
Living people
1988 births
Musicians from Rome
21st-century Italian singers